The Women's K-4 200 metres canoeing event at the 2015 Southeast Asian Games took place June 9, 2015, at Marina Channel in Marina Bay, Singapore.

Thailand won the gold medal, while Singapore and Indonesia won the silver and bronze medal respectively.

Schedule
All times are Singapore Standard Time (UTC+08:00)

Start list

Results

References

Canoeing at the 2015 Southeast Asian Games
Women's sports competitions in Singapore
2015 in women's canoeing